Powder Horn is a golf course community and census-designated place (CDP) in Sheridan County, Wyoming, United States. As of the 2020 census, it had a population of 682.

The community is in the valley of Little Goose Creek, which flows north to join Big Goose Creek in Sheridan, forming Goose Creek, which in turn is a north-flowing tributary of the Tongue River, leading to the Yellowstone River in Montana.

References 

Populated places in Sheridan County, Wyoming
Census-designated places in Sheridan County, Wyoming
Census-designated places in Wyoming